Greatest Hits from the Bong is the greatest hits album by American hip hop group Cypress Hill. It was released on December 13, 2005 via Columbia Records. Production was handled by Alchemist, DJ Khalil, Fredwreck, T-Ray and Cypress Hill themselves. It features guest appearances from Tego Calderón.

The compilation contains nine hit songs from previous CDs and two new tracks, "EZ Come EZ Go" and "The Only Way". The disc also contains a bonus Reggaeton mix of "Latin Thugs" featuring Tego Calderon. European pressings contained an additional three bonus tracks. A European reissue, with substantially different artwork, was released in 2006 via Sony BMG Music Entertainment. Although this album is called Greatest Hits from the Bong, it does not include the song "Hits from the Bong".

Track listing

Notes
Tracks 1 to 3 are taken from the 1991 album Cypress Hill
Tracks 4 and 5 are taken from the 1993 album Black Sunday
Track 6 is taken from the 1995 album III: Temples Of Boom
Tracks 7 and 13 are taken from the 1998 album IV
Tracks 8 and 14 are taken from the 2000 album Skull & Bones
Track 9 is taken from the 2004 album Til Death Do Us Part
Track 15 is taken from the 2001 album Stoned Raiders
Tracks 10 to 12 were recorded in 2005.

Personnel

Louis "B-Real" Freese – rap vocals, producer & mixing (track 11)
Senen "Sen Dog" Reyes – rap vocals
Lawrence "DJ Muggs" Muggerud – producer (tracks: 1-4, 6-8, 13-15), mixing (tracks: 1-8, 13-15), arranger (tracks: 7-8, 13-15)
Camillo Wong "Chino" Moreno – speech (track 8)
Erik "Everlast" Schrody – speech (track 8)
Tego Calderón – toasting (tracks: 9, 12)
Barron Ricks – rap vocals (track 13)
Todd Ray – producer (track 5)
Alan "The Alchemist" Maman – producer (tracks: 9, 12)
John Kirby – keyboards (track 10)
Daniel Seeff – bass (track 10)
Khalil Abdul-Rahman – producer (track 10)
Farid "Fredwreck" Nassar – keyboards, guitar, producer, mixing (track 11)
DJ Kazzanova – remixer (track 12)
Joe "The Butcher" Nicolo – mixing (tracks: 1-5)
Jason Roberts – recording (tracks: 1-3), engineering (tracks: 4-6)
Michael Miller – recording (tracks: 1-3), engineering (tracks: 13-15)
Troy Staton – additional mixing (track 8)
Rob Hill – recording & mixing (track 9)
Brian "Big Bass" Gardner – mastering (tracks: 10-11)
James Cruz – mastering (track 12)
Rob Abeyta – design
Estevan Oriol – photography
Ryan Ruden – coordinator
Paul D. Rosenberg – management
Tracy McNew – management

Charts

References

External links

Cypress Hill albums
2005 greatest hits albums
Albums produced by DJ Muggs
Albums produced by DJ Khalil
Albums produced by Fredwreck
Columbia Records compilation albums
Albums produced by the Alchemist (musician)